The Independent Patriots for Change (IPC) is a political party in Namibia. It was founded by Panduleni Itula  in August 2020. As an independent presidential candidate in the November 2019 election, Itula won the best result of a losing candidates ever in elections in Namibia. At the founding meeting on 2 August 2020 in Windhoek, Itula was elected party president, Brian Kefas Black chairman and Christine Esperanza !Aochamus general secretary.

The party participated in the 2020 local and regional council elections. It won the municipal elections in the commercial hubs Walvis Bay and Swakopmund, and 29 seats in different constituencies in Northern Namibia, hitherto considered an impenetrable SWAPO stronghold.

References

2020 establishments in Namibia
Political parties established in 2020
Political parties in Namibia